Gutweed may refer to:

 Ulva intestinalis, a seaweed
 Sonchus arvensis, a terrestrial plant